The Great Momentum is the ninth studio album by Austrian symphonic metal band Edenbridge. It was released on 17 February 2017 on the SPV label. Bassist Wolfgang Rothbauer left Edenbridge in 2016, so Lanvall performed the bass in the recording of this album. Drummer Max Pointner had also quit in 2016, being replaced by new drummer Johannes Jungreithmeier.

Reception

The Great Momentum received mixed professional reviews. While the Sonic Seducer was very positive about the production of the album, the musical diversity and drummer Jungreithmeier's debut, the Italian edition of Metal Hammer called the album "almost disappointing". The reviewer wrote that it was far away from the class of previous releases like The Bonding. According to the Soundscape magazine, there was "not a lot of variety within the songs" and the album did not contain any new ideas.

The Great Momentum reached position 82 of the German album charts being the band's second album to chart in Germany.

Track listing

The album also contains a bonus disc featuring the instrumental versions of all tracks.

Personnel
Credits adapted from Edenbridge's official website.

Edenbridge
Sabine Edelsbacher – vocals
Lanvall – lead and rhythm guitars, bass guitar, keyboards, piano, acoustic guitars, hammered dulcimer, bouzouki
Dominik Sebastian – lead and rhythm guitars
Johannes Jungreithmeier – drums

Guest musicians
Erik Martensson – lead vocals on "Until the End of Time"
Thomas Strübler – backing vocals and choirs
Alexander "LX" Koller – backing vocals on "The Die Is Not Cast" and "The Greatest Gift Of All"
Junge Philharmonie Freistadt – orchestra

Production
Lanvall – producer, music, vocal melodies, orchestral arrangement, orchestral score, recording, drum recording, mixing, orchestra recording
Drums recorded by Frank Pitters and Lanvall
Drum recordings assisted by Anton Konrath
Orchestra recorded by Matthias Kronsteiner and Lanvall
Mixed by Karl Groom
Mastered by Mika Jussila at Finnvox Studios
Cover design by Anthony Clarkson
Cover and layout design by Johannes Jungreithmeier

Charts

References

2017 albums
Edenbridge (band) albums
SPV GmbH albums